Antonio Fernández Díaz known as Fosforito, (born August 3, 1932 in Puente Genil, Córdoba Province, Spain) is a flamenco singer and winner of the fifth Golden Key of flamenco singing.  Only five of these have been awarded since the award's inception in 1862.  Its previous winners were Tomás "El Nitri," Manuel Vallejo, Antonio Mairena, and Camarón de la Isla (posthumous).

Partial discography
 Arte flamenco Vol.1 (Universo flamenco) (2005).
 Selección antológica Vol. 1 (Universo flamenco) (2005).
 Selección antológica Vol. 2 (Universo flamenco) (2005).
 Selección antológica Vol. 3 (Universo flamenco) (2005).
 Antonio Fernández "Fosforito" (2004).
 50 años de flamenco (2ª época) (2003).
 Selección antológica Vol. 1 (2003).
 Selección antológica Vol. 2 (2003).
 Selección antológica Vol. 3 (2003).
 Misa flamenca en Córdoba (2003).
 Cristal suelto (2002).
 Selección antológica del cante flamenco (2002)
 Cante y guitarra (with Paco de Lucía) (1999).
 Misa flamenca (1994).
 Grabaciones históricas. Vol. 34. Córdoba 1956.

Awards
 Premio Nacional de Cante (National Award to Flamenco Singing, 1968) from Cátedra de Flamencología of Jerez.
 "Mercedes la Serneta" award (1977).
 II Compás de Cante (1985).
 Pastora Pavón "Niña de los peines" Award (1999) from the Andalusian autonomous government.
 Favourite y Gold Medal of Puente Genil.
 Premio Ondas.
 V Gold Key of Flamenco Singing.

1932 births
Living people
People from Campiña Sur (Córdoba)
Flamenco singers
Spanish male singers